Wilson Júnior or Wilson Jr. may refer to:
Wilson Júnior (footballer, born 1976), Brazilian football goalkeeper
Wilson Júnior (footballer, born 1991), Brazilian football forward
Wilson Fittipaldi Júnior (born 1943), Brazilian former racing driver

See also
Woodrow Wilson Junior College (disambiguation)
Wilson Junior High School